Zdeňka Málková (born 19 January 1975) is a former Czech tennis player who was crowned 1991 ITF World Champion in girls' singles.

Málková won five singles (including a $50,000 tournament in Karlovy Vary as a 16-year-old) and six doubles titles on the ITF tour during her career. On 4 May 1992, she reached her best singles ranking of world number 168. On 16 September 1991, she peaked at world number 213 in the doubles rankings.

In 1991, Málková was a finalist in the girls' doubles tournament of the French Open. Later that year, she made her WTA tour debut at the OTB Open in Schenectady, New York.

ITF finals

Singles (5–3)

Doubles (6–3)

Junior Grand Slam finals (0–1)

Girls' doubles

References

External links 
 
 

1975 births
Living people
Czech female tennis players
Czechoslovak female tennis players